Charkviani is a prominent Georgian surname from Upper Svaneti, the Mulakh clan. It may refer to:

 Candide Charkviani (1906–1994), Soviet politician, First Secretary of the Georgian Communist party in 1938–1952
 Gela Charkviani (born 1939), Georgian diplomat and journalist
 Irakli Charkviani (1961–2006), Georgian musician, poet and writer
 Jansugh Charkviani (1931–2017), Georgian poet

Georgian-language surnames